Frank Lesser is an American author and satirist best known for his work on The Colbert Report.

Life
After attending Brown University, where he wrote for The Brown Jug and concentrated in film, Lesser worked as a production assistant and freelance writer for various Viacom stations. Joining Comedy Central's The Colbert Report as a writer in 2005, Lesser won four Primetime Emmys.  Most recently, he has written the satirical book Sad Monsters and the IMDb original series You're Not a Monster. His humor has appeared in The New York Times, The Washington Post, Slate.com, and McSweeney’s Internet Tendency.

The Colbert Report
I met somebody who had just been hired as a writer’s assistant on Colbert. She invited me to a taping and asked what was up. I told her this whole sob story ending with, “I was at the lowest point in my life,” and she said, “Oh well, you know that they're hiring,” and then sort of didn't say anything. And then a month later they hired me, although she did say after I got hired, “Yeah, give it a month and a half, you'll be complaining just as much as you were before.” I think she really nailed the comedy writer mindset. On The Colbert Report Lesser has appeared as different characters, among them a drug lord, a conquistador, and Colbert's "interview stunt beard." During his send-off on the show, Colbert remarked that "Around the office Frank was known for his intelligence, sensitivity, and his completely unproducible scripts. Seriously, Frank, where are we going to get a hovercraft." When asked about his experience writing for The Colbert Report, Lesser said: It’s wonderful when the person who’s in charge is a brilliantly talented, hilarious person. And so in some ways, you don’t feel as bad when they cut your jokes because you’re like, “Okay, well this person knows what they’re talking about,” and in other ways you’re like, “Why doesn’t Stephen Colbert like this joke?”

References

American comedy writers
American satirists
Brown University alumni
1980 births
Living people
American male non-fiction writers
21st-century American non-fiction writers
Writers from Columbus, Ohio
21st-century American male writers